Memory (also billed as mem-(o)-re and Memore) is a 2006 American techno-thriller film written by Bennett Joshua Davlin, and starring Billy Zane, Tricia Helfer and Terry Chen.

Plot
While lecturing in Brazil, Taylor Briggs, an American authority on memory, consults on a patient found deep in the Amazon. While examining the patient, Taylor is accidentally exposed to a substance which unlocks memories that do not belong to him.

Cast 
Billy Zane as Taylor Briggs
Tricia Helfer as Stephanie Jacobs
Ann-Margret as Carol Hargrave
Dennis Hopper as Max Lichtenstein
Terry Chen as Dr. Deepra Chang
Dan Pelchat as Spectre 
Emily Hirst as Bonnie McHale

Production 
Bennett Davlin wrote the novel first with the intention of directing and producing the film. He said: "These characters were so real to me that I just knew I had to bring them to the big screen".

References

External links 
 
 
 

2006 films
2006 psychological thriller films
Films scored by Anthony Marinelli
Fiction about memory
American psychological thriller films
2000s English-language films
2000s American films